This is a list of lighthouses in New Zealand. Maritime New Zealand operates and maintains 23 active lighthouses and 74 light beacons. All of these lighthouses are fully automated and controlled by a central control room in Wellington.

Other lights, such as the Taiaroa Head and Bean Rock lighthouses, are operated by local port authorities. There are also several decommissioned lighthouses not listed below, including the Manukau South Head, Boulder Bank, and Akaroa lighthouses.

Many of New Zealand's earliest lighthouses were designed by marine engineer James Balfour and his successor John Blackett.

The New Zealand Nautical Almanac lists all of New Zealand's active lighthouses and lights, along with their locations, characteristics and ranges.

North Island

South Island

See also 
 Lists of lighthouses and lightvessels

References

External links 

 
 

New Zealand
Lighthouses
Lighthouses